Dieppe is a port in Upper Normandy, France.

Dieppe may also refer to:

In places:
 Dieppe, New Brunswick, a city in Canada near Moncton, New Brunswick
 Dieppe-sous-Douaumont, a French commune in Lorraine, France
 Dieppe Bay Town, a seaside town on Saint Kitts
 Dieppe Barracks, a military installation used by the Singapore Army

In ships:
HMS Dieppe (1905), a steamship converted as a troopship, hospital ship, yacht and RN armed boarding craft
SS Dieppe (1905)
SS Dieppe (1847), a LB&SCR ship
SS Dieppe (1855), a LB&SCR ship
LST 3016 or HMS Dieppe, an amphibious warfare ship of the Royal Navy

In other uses:
Dieppe Raid, a 1942 World War II Allied attack on German forces in the French town
Dieppe, the battle honour awarded to forces participating in the Dieppe Raid
Dieppe (board game), a board wargame simulating the Dieppe Raid  
Dieppe (film), a 1993 Canadian miniseries about the raid

See also 
 Dieppe Commandos, an ice hockey team in Dieppe, New Brunswick
 Dieppe Centre-Lewisville a provincial electoral district in New Brunswick
 Dieppe-Memramcook, a former provincial electoral district in New Brunswick; since replaced by Memramcook-Lakeville-Dieppe
 Dieppe Gardens, a park in Windsor, Ontario
 Dieppe maps, a series of 16th-century world maps made in Dieppe, Seine-Maritime
 Johnny Depp, American actor of French Huguenot extraction (descendant of Pierre Dieppe)